Silvio Merlo (born 6 December 1920) was an Argentine sailor. He competed in the Swallow event at the 1948 Summer Olympics.

References

External links
 

1920 births
Possibly living people
Argentine male sailors (sport)
Olympic sailors of Argentina
Sailors at the 1948 Summer Olympics – Swallow
Sportspeople from Buenos Aires